Mohd Faizal bin Abdul Rani (born 17 January 1994) is a Malaysian footballer who plays as a forward.

References

External links
 

1994 births
Living people
Sri Pahang FC players
Malaysian footballers
Malaysian people of Malay descent
People from Terengganu
Malaysia Super League players
Association football forwards